Last Blood or variation, may refer to:

Film
 The Last Blood (1983 film) or Tornado: The Last Blood, an Italian war film
 The Last Blood or Hard Boiled 2, a 1991 Hong Kong action film
 Last Blood (2009 film) or Blood: The Last Vampire, a Japanese vampire film
 Rambo: Last Blood, a 2019 American action film

Literature
 Last Blood (webcomic), a zombie and vampire series published by Blatant Comics
 Last Blood (Blade of the Immortal), volume 14 of the Japanese manga comic, see List of Blade of the Immortal chapters
 Last Blood (2013 novel), volume 5 of House of Commaré novel series by Kristen Painter

Other uses
 Last Blood (DVD), volume 12 of Baki the Grappler

See also

 
 First Blood (disambiguation)
 Blood (disambiguation)
 Last (disambiguation)